Kwes (sometimes stylised as  kwes, kwes., Kwes. or [o=o]. ) is a British music producer, composer and artist from London, England. Kwes is also currently signed to Warp as a solo artist and released his debut album, ilp in October 2013. He has since gone on to produce music for the likes of Damon Albarn, Bobby Womack, Solange Knowles, Sampha, Loyle Carner, Black Coffee, Nubya Garcia, Tirzah and numerous others.

Biography
Kwes began playing his grandparents' organ at the age of four and his grandmother bought him his first small keyboard aged 5.  For his tenth birthday, he received a radio/tape recorder with a built-in microphone, which launched his interest in sound recording.

Kwes has chromesthesia (sound-to-colour synaesthesia).

His earliest synaesthetic experiences occurred around the age of 4 and he attempted to colour paper with the particular colours he was seeing when listening to music.  These colours have been set since he first discovered his condition: "any form of a G-chord would have orange in it, and the other notes which are not G accompanying that G-chord would have an effect on the type of orange it is.  Majors tend to be slightly brighter. Same applies for D which is always – yellow/green, E which is Yellow/gold, F which is violet/blue, C – Blue, A – light blue, B – yellow/gold/green."

His synaesthetic impressions of his own music are translated in the artwork to his solo releases, including "Hearts in Home" and "No Need to Run".

Discography

Artist discography

Albums

EPs

Remix EP

Singles
"Hearts in Home" (16 February 2009)
"Get Up" (13 November 2011)
"Bashful" (7 March 2012)
"Rollerblades" (26 November 2012)

Mixtapes

Live session duties
Ebony Bones – Guitarist (2006–2007, 2008)
Bono Must Die now O. Children – Keyboardist (2007)
Jack Peñate – Laptop and keyboards (2009)
Kwesachu (with Micachu) – co-production and co-selector (2009–?)
Elan Tamara – Bassist (2009–2011)
Leftfield – Keyboards and Computers (2010)
Bobby Womack – Keyboards (2012–2013)

References

External links
Official website
Kwes. on Warp
Kwes. on Discogs

1987 births
British record producers
British audio engineers
British songwriters
British people of Ghanaian descent
English record producers
English audio engineers
English songwriters
English people of Ghanaian descent
Living people
Singers from London
People from Lewisham
Warp (record label) artists
XL Recordings artists
21st-century English singers